Artist Rooms is the title of a collection of international modern and contemporary art, established through the d'Offay donation in 2008. Comprising over 1,500 works by 38 artists, it is owned by the National Galleries of Scotland and the Tate, on behalf of the United Kingdom, which care for the collection together and arrange for its presentation throughout the country in museums, galleries, and exhibition spaces. Each "room" is devoted to a specific artist with the aim of providing an immersive and comprehensive experience of that artist's work, a format described by Nicholas Serota as being "without precedent anywhere in the world."

Establishment
In 2002, Anthony d'Offay closed the gallery he had run since 1963 with Anne Seymour and Marie-Louise Laband, and began building a collection of more than 1,000 works from internationally recognized artists, including Joseph Beuys, Andy Warhol, Jeff Koons and Damien Hirst. The collection, then valued in excess of £100 million, was donated jointly in 2008 to the National Galleries of Scotland and Tate, with the assistance of the National Heritage Memorial Fund, the Art Fund and the Scottish and British governments.

Present-day work
Since 2009, there have been 132 Artist Rooms across the United Kingdom, with more than 29 million exhibition visitors. The Art Fund charity was one of the original principal supporters of Artist Rooms. It continues to sponsor the touring program of exhibitions from the collection and facilitates dynamic education projects in each venue.

Artist Rooms exhibitions have been held in Tate Britain, Tate Modern, Scottish National Gallery of Modern Art, Wolverhampton Art Gallery, National Museum Wales, De La Warr Pavilion, mima, Kettle's Yard, Baltic Centre for Contemporary Art, The Hepworth, and Tramway.

Education
More than 55,000 young people have been involved in the education programs, which are supported by the Artist Rooms Foundation, created in 2011.

Reception

During its fifth anniversary, Maria Miller, secretary of state for  culture, media and sport, stated that, "Artist Rooms has been a spectacular success since it was established just five years ago. Thanks to Anthony d’Offay’s generosity, and the hard work and imagination of all those involved in the project, really high quality art has been made available for millions to enjoy up and down the UK. Long may it continue."

Richard Doment wrote that, "it [Artist Rooms] is the most important thing that has happened in the art world in this country in my lifetime."

Similarly, Jonathan Jones described Artist Rooms as, "the best collection of contemporary work," adding that, "what really matters is the strength of the works, and the fact that Britain's museums, large and small, can now draw on such a high-quality treasury."

Artists in Artist Rooms

Diane Arbus
Georg Baselitz
Joseph Beuys
Louise Bourgeois
Vija Celmins
Martin Creed
Ian Hamilton Finlay
Dan Flavin
Ellen Gallagher
Gilbert & George
Douglas Gordon
Johan Grimonprez
Richard Hamilton
Damien Hirst
Jenny Holzer
Alex Katz
Anselm Kiefer
Jeff Koons
Jannis Kounellis
Sol LeWitt
Roy Lichtenstein
Richard Long
Robert Mapplethorpe
John Marston
Agnes Martin
Don McCullin
Mario Merz
Ron Mueck
Bruce Nauman
Trevor Phillips
Charles Ray
Gerhard Richter
Ed Ruscha
Robert Ryman
August Sander
Robert Therrien
Cy Twombly
Bill Viola
Andy Warhol
Lawrence Weiner
Francesca Woodman

References

External links
ARTIST ROOMS website
Art Fund on ARTIST ROOMS
Tate on ARTIST ROOMS
National Galleries Scotland on ARTIST ROOMS

Art museum collections
National Galleries of Scotland
Tate galleries